Nikola Prodanov (born 26 May 1940) is a Bulgarian gymnast. He competed at the 1960 Summer Olympics and the 1964 Summer Olympics.

Prodanov is married to Bulgarian athlete Diana Yorgova, whom he married during the 1964 Summer Olympics in the Olympic village.

References

1940 births
Living people
Bulgarian male artistic gymnasts
Olympic gymnasts of Bulgaria
Gymnasts at the 1960 Summer Olympics
Gymnasts at the 1964 Summer Olympics
Sportspeople from Burgas